Montabone is a comune (municipality) in the Province of Asti in the Italian region Piedmont, located about  southeast of Turin and about  southeast of Asti.

Montabone borders the following municipalities: Acqui Terme, Bistagno, Castel Boglione, Castel Rocchero, Rocchetta Palafea, and Terzo.

Demographic evolution

References

External links
 www.comune.montabone.at.it

Cities and towns in Piedmont